Yan Naing Oo (born 31 March 1996) is a footballer from Burma, and a winger for the Myanmar U-19 football team and Shan United. He was born in North Okkalarpa Township, Yangon Division. He also the key player of Myanmar U-20 National Football Team played in 2015 FIFA U-20 World Cup. He scored opening goal of 2015 FIFA U-20 World Cup.

Club career

Zeyar Shwe Myay
Born in North Okkalapa, Yangon, Yan Naing Oo joined Zeyar Shwe Myay's youth setup in 2013, aged 17, after a trial period. He played one season for Zeyar Shwe Myay.

Shan United
On 2 May 2016,Yan Naing Oo had agreed a deal with MNL big club Shan United for free. He signed a five-year contract with the Shan United side, joining the club after the 2016 MNL half-season.

He scored his first goal for the club on 19 June, netting the first in a 2–0 away win against Yangon United.

International career
On 11 July 2014, Yan Naing Oo was included in the Myanmar under-20 team for the 2014 Hassanal Bolkiah Trophy and 2015 FIFA U-20 World Cup, the latter of which he scored.

International

International goals
Scores and results list Myanmar's goal tally first.

Honours

Club
Shan United
 Myanmar National League: 2017, 2019; runners-up: 2018
 General Aung San Shield: 2017; runners-up: 2019

International
Myanmar U20
 Hassanal Bolkiah Trophy: 2014

References

External links 
 Yan Naing Oo
 Mizzima New
 
 Yan Ning Oo pic
 
 
 Eurosport

1996 births
Living people
People from Yangon Region
Burmese footballers
Myanmar international footballers
Myanmar National League players
Shan United F.C. players
Association football wingers
Footballers at the 2018 Asian Games
Competitors at the 2017 Southeast Asian Games
Asian Games competitors for Myanmar
Southeast Asian Games competitors for Myanmar